Topical or thematic stamp collecting is the collecting of postage stamps relating to a particular subject or concept. Topics can be almost anything, from stamps on stamps, birds, trains and poets on stamps, to famous physicians and scientists, along with historical people and events on stamps, which is often a standard theme for many stamp issuing countries.

Background 

The earliest stamps simply depicted busts of reigning monarchs, important figures, or coats of arms, but as time went on stamps started to have a wider range of designs. Bears appeared on provisional stamps of St. Louis in 1845, while the beaver was featured on the earliest stamps of Canada. More than 150 years later, the variety of designs on stamps is enormous, giving topical collectors plenty of scope to find stamps for their chosen theme. In fact, so many stamps have been issued that some popular themes, such as ships or birds, have become nearly impossible to complete, and topical collectors may specialize further, such as by looking for only square-rigged sailing ships, or only flightless birds.

Collecting 
Since most types of stamp designs are commonly available and inexpensive, acquiring them is mostly a matter of poring over the stamp catalog looking for relevant types, and learning enough about the topic to recognize subtle connections. The American Topical Association and others have published handbooks and lists of larger topics.

Online marketplaces and trade platforms are the most common way of collecting new stamps.

Competitions 
Topical collecting is a recognized category for competitive exhibitions and has its own Commission with the FIP (Fédération Internationale de Philatélie).

Topics 

Some topics include:
Birds on stamps
Bicycles on stamps
Fish on stamps
Insects on stamps
Dinosaurs on stamps
People on stamps
Presidents on stamps
Ships on stamps
U.S. space exploration history on U.S. stamps
Soviet space exploration history on Soviet stamps
Stamps on stamps

Stamps with an anarchist theme were issued during the Spanish Civil War by the Confederación Nacional del Trabajo.

See also

References

Further reading
 Bold, W.E.J. van den. Handbook of Thematic Philately. Limassol: Published by James Bendon for The British Thematic Association, 1994 
 Branston, A. J. Thematic and Topical Stamp Collecting: A practical and comprehensive handbook for thematic, topical, and subject collectors. London: Batsford, 1980 
 Griffenhagen, George and Jerome Husak. Adventures in Topical Stamp Collecting. Tucson: American Topical Association, 1997
 Gupta, V.K. A Handbook on Thematic Philately. Delhi: B.D. Gupta, 1989 
 Lee, Alma. Introducing Thematic Collecting. British Philatelic Trust in conjunction with the National Philatelic Society, 1983. (Edited by Richard West)
 Martin, M. W. Topical Stamp Collecting. New York: Arco Pub. Co., 1975 
 Morris, Margaret. Thematic Stamp Collecting. London: Gibbons, 1977 
Handbooks of the American Topical Association.

External links

American Topical Association
LearnAboutStamps.com A resource for stamp collectors

Websites for particular themes
Catstamps
Scouts on Stamps Society International
Stamps on Stamps Collectors Club
Bird stamps by country
Paleontology (dinosaurs, prehistoric animals, fossils) stamps by country and by issue date

Stamp collecting
 
Philatelic terminology
Stamp collections